The rigsdaler was the currency of the Danish West Indies (now the U.S. Virgin Islands) until 1849. It was subdivided into 96 skilling. The rigsdaler was equal to  Danish rigsdaler. The rigsdaler was replaced by the daler.

Coins
In 1766 and 1767, 6, 12 and 24 skilling coins were struck in silver for the Danish West Indies. These were followed in 1816 by silver 2, 10 and 20 skilling coins, which were struck until 1848. All the coins carried the wording "Dansk Amerik(ansk) M(ynt)" (Danish American Coinage) to distinguish them from regular Danish coins.

Banknotes
In 1784 and 1785, some Danish 5 rigsdaler courant notes were reissued for use in the West Indies with new denomination of  rigsdaler printed on the previously blank reverses. Regular issues began in 1788 with denominations of 20, 50 and 100 rigsdaler. 5 and 10 rigsdaler notes were added in 1806 when the 20 rigsdaler denomination was discontinued.

References

External links
 

Modern obsolete currencies
Currencies of the Caribbean
Currencies of the Kingdom of Denmark
Economy of the United States Virgin Islands
19th-century economic history
1849 disestablishments
Economy of the Danish West Indies
18th century in the Danish West Indies
19th century in the Danish West Indies